The Rosablanca Formation (Kir) is a geological formation of the Altiplano Cundiboyacense, Eastern Ranges of the Colombian Andes and the Middle Magdalena Basin. The formation consists of grey limestones, dolomites and shales with at the upper part sandstones.

Definition 
The formation was first defined by Wheeler in 1929.

Description

Lithologies 

Stratigraphy and depositional environment 
The Rosablanca Formation overlies the Arcabuco Formation and is overlain by the Ritoque Formation. The age has been estimated to be Valanginian. Stratigraphically, the formation is time equivalent with the Macanal Formation.

Fossils 
Fossils of the decapod crustacean Diaulax rosablanca have been found in and named after the Rosablanca Formation. In 2019, fossils of brachiopodSellithyris elizabetha were described from the formation. In 2020 remains of indeterminate pterosaurs were described from the formation, including pterodactyloids and non-Pteranodontian ornithocheiroids. In 2005 the remains of Platychelyid sea turtle Notoemys zapatocaensis were described.

Outcrops 

The Rosablanca Formation is found, apart from its type locality on the Mesa de Los Santos, Santander, in Boyacá and the Middle Magdalena Basin.

Regional correlations

See also 

 Geology of the Eastern Hills
 Geology of the Ocetá Páramo
 Geology of the Altiplano Cundiboyacense

Notes and references

Notes

References

Bibliography

Maps

External links 
 

Geologic formations of Colombia
Cretaceous Colombia
Lower Cretaceous Series of South America
Valanginian Stage
Limestone formations
Shallow marine deposits
Formations
Formations
Formations
Formations